Viktor Nikolaevich Razumovskiy (3 August 1932 – 4 January 2019) was a Soviet footballer who played as a midfielder in the 1950s.

Career
Born in Moscow, Razumovskiy began playing youth football with local side FC Torpedo Moscow. He became a professional with FC Lokomotiv Moscow where he scored 10 goals in 27 Soviet Top League matches. Razumovskiy participated in Lokomotiv Moscow's 1955 tour of Asia, playing against national sides from Burma, India and Indonesia.

Razumovskiy died in January 2019.

References

External links
 Profile at Footballfacts.ru

1939 births
2019 deaths
Soviet footballers
FC Lokomotiv Moscow players
Russian football managers
Association football midfielders